DAHR may refer to: